Michael Scott Matthews (born October 24, 1973) is a former Major League Baseball pitcher who pitched from  to . Matthews graduated from Woodbridge Senior High School in Woodbridge, Virginia. 
Matthews pitched a single season at Montgomery Junior College in Rockville, Maryland in  before being drafted by the Cleveland Indians in the second round of that year's amateur draft. In August , he was traded twice in a single month, first to the Boston Red Sox organization, then to the St. Louis Cardinals three weeks later. He made his major league debut with the Cardinals on May 31, 2000.

Matthews was a relief pitcher in the major leagues.

External links

1973 births
Living people
Cincinnati Reds players
Major League Baseball pitchers
Baseball players from Virginia
Milwaukee Brewers players
New York Mets players
People from Woodbridge, Virginia
St. Louis Cardinals players
San Diego Padres players
Canton-Akron Indians players
Akron Aeros players
Montgomery Raptors baseball players
Buffalo Bisons (minor league) players
Memphis Redbirds players
Louisville Bats players
Norfolk Tides players